This is a list of songs that reached number one on the Billboard magazine Streaming Songs chart in 2014.

Chart history

See also
2014 in music
List of Billboard Hot 100 number-one singles of 2014
List of number-one On-Demand Songs of 2014

References

United States Streaming Songs
Streaming 2014